The Amorous Prawn or The Amorous Mr. Prawn is a 1962 British comedy film directed by Anthony Kimmins and starring Ian Carmichael, Joan Greenwood and Cecil Parker. The film was based on a 1959 farcical play by Kimmins.

In the United States the film was retitled The Playgirl and the War Minister to exploit the Profumo affair.

Premise
General Fitzadam receives his final posting in the remote Scottish Highlands. When the General and his wife discover that they cannot afford the country cottage where they plan to retire, his wife decides to run their residence as a hotel for wealthy Americans using the services of soldiers and an expert poacher.

Cast

Production
The original play had run for over 900 performances in the West End.

Critical reception
Variety called the film "non-demanding light entertainment, cheerfully put over by a reliable cast of popular British thesps."

References

External links

1962 comedy films
British comedy films
Films directed by Anthony Kimmins
British films based on plays
Military humor in film
Films scored by John Barry (composer)
1960s English-language films
1960s British films